A tikkun or tiqqun is a book used by Jews to prepare for reading or writing a Torah scroll.  There are two types of tikkun, a tikkun kor'im and a tikkun soferim.

Tikkun qor'im

A tikkun kor'im or tiqqun qor'im (readers' tikkun) is a study guide used when preparing to chant [lein] the Torah reading from the Torah in a synagogue.  Each tikkun contains two renditions of the Masoretic Text in Hebrew. The right side of each page is written with the cantillation marks and vowel points, while the left is written in unpointed Hebrew, as it appears in the actual scroll. People who chant from the Torah must learn the tune and the pronunciation of the words beforehand, as the scroll itself has neither points nor cantillation marks, and because there are places where the word to be read (the qere) differs from that written (the kethib) in the scroll.

Tikkun soferim
A tiqqun soferim (scribes' tikkun) is similar, but is designed as a guide or model text for scribes writing a copy of the Torah by hand. It contains additional information of use to scribes, such as directions concerning writing particular words, traditions of calligraphic ornamentation, and information about spacing and justification. For instance, it helps the scribe to know how many letters there are per line, so a tikkun soferim gives the size of each line, measured in yud-widths (because yud is the smallest Hebrew letter).

References

Resources
 The Kestenbaum Edition Tikkun: The Torah Reader's Compendium – Complete tikkun with pointed Hebrew, unpointed Hebrew, plus English translation and commentary.
 Tanakh on Demand – On-line PDF's in Hebrew of any Torah section, including option for tikkun format.
 Navigating the Bible II – Online version of the Hebrew Bible, including tikkun format of a few verses at a time, and audio of cantillation.
 ScrollScraper – An online tikkun for an arbitrary excerpt of Torah verses, leveraging the bible.ort.org infrastructure.
 Mechon Mamre – Innovative online 'tikkun', with vowels and cantillation appearing and disappearing with a mouse rollover.

Hebrew Bible
Jewish prayer and ritual texts
Torah reading
Sifrei Kodesh